Octochaetus is a genus of earthworms of family Octochaetidae native to Australia, New Zealand, and Malaysia.

Classification 
Cladogram from Catalogue of Life:

References

External links 

Megascolecidae